Heerhugowaard railway station serves the towns of Heerhugowaard and Broek op Langedijk, Netherlands. The station opened on 20 December 1865 and is located on the Den Helder–Amsterdam railway and Heerhugowaard–Hoorn railway. The train services are operated by Nederlandse Spoorwegen.

The station was known as Heerhugowaard-Broek op Langedijk between 1948 and 1976. The station has 3 platforms and a station building. The previous station buildings were used between 1862 and 1967, when it was demolished, and also a building from 1967 to 1989 and is now being used as a snackbar.

Train services
The station is served by the following service(s):

2x per hour Intercity services Schagen - Alkmaar - Amsterdam - Utrecht - Eindhoven - Maastricht (peak hours only)
2x per hour Intercity services Den Helder - Alkmaar - Amsterdam - Utrecht - Arnhem - Nijmegen
2x per hour Local services (Sprinter) Hoorn - Alkmaar - Uitgeest - Haarlem - Amsterdam

Bus services
The following bus services are operated by Connexxion and call at the station.

 162 - Heerhugowaard - Alkmaar
 407 - Heerhugowaard - Broek op Langedijk - Zuid Scharwoude - Noord Scharwoude - Heerhugowaard
 409 - Heerhugowaard - Rustenburg - Ursem - Hensbroek - Obdam

External links

NS website 
Dutch public transport travel planner 

Railway stations in North Holland
Railway stations opened in 1865
Railway stations on the Staatslijn K
1865 establishments in the Netherlands
Dijk en Waard
Railway stations in the Netherlands opened in the 19th century